The 2005 Tecate/Telmex Monterrey Grand Prix was the second round of the 2005 Bridgestone Presents the Champ Car World Series Powered by Ford season, held on May 22, 2005 on the streets of Fundidora Park in Monterrey, Mexico.  Sébastien Bourdais was the polesitter and the race winner was Bruno Junqueira.  The race was Junqueria's eighth and last victory in an American open wheel racing event.  Junqueria was seriously injured in a crash at the 2005 Indianapolis 500 the following weekend and missed the rest of the Champ Car season.

Qualifying results

Race

Caution flags

Notes

 New Track Record Sébastien Bourdais 1:13.627 (Qualification Session #2)
 New Race Record Bruno Junqueira 2:03:38.021
 Average Speed 77.602 mph

Championship standings after the race
Drivers' Championship standings

 Note: Only the top five positions are included.

External links
 Full Weekend Times & Results
 Friday Qualifying Results
 Saturday Qualifying Results
 Race Box Score

Monterrey
Grand Prix of Monterrey
21st century in Monterrey
2005 in Mexican motorsport